Molly is a two-part Australian miniseries about Australian music personality Molly Meldrum. Aired on the Seven Network, the first part premiered on 7 February 2016, with the second and final half screening on 14 February. It is based on Meldrum's biography, The Never, Um ... Ever Ending Story, which was written with journalist Jeff Jenkins.

Synopsis
Framed by Ian "Molly" Meldrum's fall from a ladder outside his home during the 2011 Christmas season and his resulting coma, Molly flashes back and forth through the key events of Meldrum's life, from his small beginnings in Quambatook, through his rise to becoming one of the biggest names in Australian music.

The central focus of the series is the invention, rise and eventual fall of the high-rating TV series Countdown, and how it shaped Meldrum's life and legacy. The opportunities afforded to him as host of the groundbreaking new show, along with his accessible personality and passion for music saw him become an essential figure of the Australian music scene in the 1970s, '80s and beyond.

Cast
Samuel Johnson as Molly Meldrum
Aaron Glenane as Michael Gudinski
Rebecca Breeds as Camille, Meldrum's fiancée
Ben Gerrard as Caroline, Meldrum's transgender flatmate
T.J. Power as Robbie Weekes, co-creator and director of Countdown
Tom O'Sullivan as Michael Shrimpton, co-creator and producer of Countdown
Benedict Hardie as Alan Wade, an ABC executive who clashes with Meldrum
Heather Mitchell as Pat Hatcher, Wade's successor
Krew Boylan as Lynne Randell
Connor Crawford as John Paul Young
Ben Geurens as Shirley Strachan
Jacinta Stapleton as Madonna
Kate Atkinson as Meldrum's mother
Helen Morse as Meldrum's grandmother

Comedians Ed Kavalee, Andy Lee, Hamish Blake and Mick Molloy also make cameo appearances.  Molly Meldrum appeared as himself in an epilogue.

Production
Filming of the telemovie took place in early 2015.

Reception

Ratings
The first part of the telemovie was the highest-rating non-sport program in Australia for 2016.

With 3.02 million national viewers (2.1 million metropolitan and 931,000 regional).

Samuel Johnson went on to win the Gold Logie the following year for his performance.

Music

A three-disc soundtrack featuring 60 tracks was released on 27 November 2015 by Liberation Music, titled Molly: Do Yourself a Favour after one of Meldrum's catchphrases on Countdown. It peaked at number 1 on the ARIA Albums Chart.

A second three-disc soundtrack was released on 21 October 2016 by Liberation Music, titled Molly: Counting Down The Hits.

References

External links
 

Seven Network original programming
2010s Australian television miniseries
2016 Australian television series debuts
2016 Australian television series endings
Cultural depictions of Australian women
Cultural depictions of pop musicians
Cultural depictions of journalists
Cultural depictions of presenters
Cultural depictions of Madonna